Gordonia rhizosphera is a bacterium from the genus Gordonia which has been isolated from rhizosphere soil from a mangrove plant in Japan.

References

External links 
Type strain of Gordonia rhizosphera at BacDive -  the Bacterial Diversity Metadatabase

Mycobacteriales
Bacteria described in 1998